Carabus akinini akinini is a bronze coloured subspecies of beetle from family Carabidae, that is endemic to Kyrgyzstan. They are brownish-black coloured with either red or black pronotum.

References

akinini akinini
Beetles described in 1886
Endemic fauna of Kyrgyzstan